The 1976 World Championship Tennis Finals was a tennis tournament played on indoor carpet courts. It was the 6th edition of the WCT Finals and was part of the 1976 World Championship Tennis circuit. It was played at the Moody Coliseum in Dallas, Texas, in the United States and was held from May 4 through May 9, 1976.

Finals

Singles

 Björn Borg defeated  Guillermo Vilas 1–6, 6–1, 7–5, 6–1
 It was Borg's 3rd title of the year and the 19th of his career.

References

External links
 WCT pre-tournament news release (April 28, 1976)

 

 
World Championship Tennis Finals
WCT Finals
World Championship Tennis
World Championship Tennis Finals
World Championship Tennis Finals